James Collinson (9 May 1825 – 24 January  1881) was a Victorian painter who was a member of the Pre-Raphaelite Brotherhood from 1848 to 1850.

Life
He was born at Mansfield, Nottinghamshire and was the son of a bookseller. He entered the Royal Academy Schools, and was a fellow-student of Holman Hunt, and Dante Gabriel Rossetti.

Collinson was a devout Christian who was attracted to the devotional and high church aspects of Pre-Raphaelitism. 
A convert to Catholicism, Collinson reverted to high Anglicanism in order to marry Christina Rossetti, but his conscience forced his return to Catholicism and the ending of the engagement. 
When Millais' painting Christ in the House of his Parents was accused of blasphemy, Collinson resigned from the Brotherhood in the belief that it was bringing the Christian religion into disrepute.

During his period as a Pre-Raphaelite, Collinson contributed a long devotional poem to The Germ and produced a number of religious works, most importantly The Renunciation of St. Elizabeth of Hungary (1850). 
After his resignation Collinson trained for the priesthood at a Jesuit college, but did not complete his studies.

In 1858, he married Eliza Wheeler, one of the sisters-in-law of the painter John Rogers Herbert, an early influence on the Pre-Raphaelites. Returning to his artistic career he painted a number of secular genre paintings, the best-known of which are To Let and For Sale, both of which lightheartedly depict pretty women in situations that suggest moral temptation.

He was secretary of the Society of British Artists from 1861 to 1870. 
In the latter part of his life he lived in Brittany, where he painted The Holy Family (1878).
He died in April 1881.

Gallery

See also
List of Pre-Raphaelite paintings - including the work of James Collinson.

References

Attribution

External links

1825 births
1881 deaths
Academics of the Royal College of Art
19th-century English painters
English male painters
Converts to Roman Catholicism from Anglicanism
English Roman Catholics
Pre-Raphaelite painters
People from Mansfield
Alumni of the Royal Academy Schools
Catholic painters
19th-century English male artists